Go for It is the third album by Stiff Little Fingers, released in 1981 (see 1981 in music).

Track listing
All tracks composed by Fingers and Gordon Ogilvie; except where noted. 
"Roots, Radicals, Rockers and Reggae" (Bunny O'Riley, arranged by Fingers) – 3:59
"Just Fade Away" – 3:06
"Go for It" (Fingers) – 3:17
"The Only One" – 4:18
"Hits and Misses" (Jake Burns, Gordon Ogilvie) – 3:51
"Kicking Up a Racket" – 2:44
"Safe as Houses" – 5:29
"Gate 49" – 2:23
"Silver Lining" – 3:04
"Piccadilly Circus" – 4:43
The following tracks were included on the 2001 EMI re-release:

Chart Position

Personnel
Stiff Little Fingers
Jake Burns	– vocals, guitar; piano on "Silver Lining"
Jim Reilly	– drums
Henry Cluney – guitar, backing vocals
Ali McMordie – bass guitar
with:
Stewart Blandamer – alto saxophone on "Silver Lining"
Tony Hughes – trumpet on "Silver Lining"
Steve "Fixit" Farr – baritone saxophone on "Silver Lining"
Technical
Doug Bennett – producer, piano on "Silver Lining"
Bill Gill – engineer
David Hamilton Smith – engineer
Shaun Bradley – equipment
Agency  – cow bell
John "Teflon" Simms – cover illustration
Eugene Adebari – photography

References

1981 albums
Stiff Little Fingers albums
Chrysalis Records albums